The 2016 Samsung Beach Soccer Intercontinental Cup was the sixth edition of the Beach Soccer Intercontinental Cup, an annual international beach soccer tournament. It was hosted at Jumeirah Beach in Dubai, United Arab Emirates from 1 to 5 November 2016. Eight teams participated in the competition, ending with Brazil winning their second title.

For sponsorship reasons, it is also known as the Samsung Beach Soccer Intercontinental Cup Dubai 2016.

Participating teams

Group stage
All matches are listed as local time in Dubai, (UTC+4).

Group A

Group B

Classification stage

5–8 places

Seventh place match

Fifth place match

Championship stage

Semi-finals

Third place match

Final

Final standings

Goalscorers
8 goals

 Bruno Xavier

7 goals

 Mauricinho
 Mesigar

6 goals

 Bokinha
 Ahmadzadeh
 Makarov
 Nikonorov
 Perera

5 goals

 Catarino da Silva
 N. Bennett
 Tepa
 Zaveroni
 A. Alblooshi

4 goals

 R. da Costa
 Paporotnyi
 Peremitin
 Taiarui
 Saganowski
 Hassan
 Shaaban
 Canale

3 goals

 Datinha
 Lima
 Akbari
 Boloukbashi
 Kubiak
 Ziober
 M. Abdelnaby
 Mostafa

2 goals

 Lucão
 Kiani
 Krasheninnikov
 Leonov
 Shishin
 Madani
 M. Ali
 E. Elsayed
 M. Al Zaabi
 Khalaf
 W. Salem

1 goal

 Valença
 Mokhtari
 Nazem
 Mesh
 Li Fung kuee
 Tavanae
 Torokhov
 R. Bennett
 Dept
 Esinovski
 Gak
 Klepczarek
 Abdelsamie
 Fawzi
 K. Elsayed
 A. Salem
 Sulaiman
 Feld
 Futagaki
 Gil
 Valentine

own goals

 Paporotnyi (against Tahiti)
 A. Salem (against Poland)
 Sulaiman (against Egypt)

Broadcasting
 Dubai Sports TV

External links
Beach Soccer Worldwide

Beach Soccer Intercontinental Cup
Beach Soccer Intercontinental Cup
International association football competitions hosted by the United Arab Emirates
Intercontinental Cup
Beach Soccer Intercontinental Cup